Dbna is a German-language platform for gay, bisexual and otherwise queer teenagers and men aged 14 to 29. It combines a social network with a forum and an online magazine covering culture and sexual health. The social network prohibits nudity, and all photos uploaded are checked by moderators. Users can ask questions on the forum anonymously. According to Dbna, it has over 30,000 users.

Name 
The name derives from the German , meaning "you are not alone".

History 
Dbna was founded in 1997. In 2009, it was nominated for the Grimme Online Award.

See also 

 PlanetRomeo

References 

1997 establishments in Germany
LGBT organisations in Germany
Sex education in Europe
LGBT social networking services
LGBT-related Internet forums
Internet properties established in 1997
Same sex online dating
Gay men's websites
Online dating services of Germany